Kirk Profit (born September 12, 1952) is a former member of the Michigan House of Representatives who is now a lobbyist with the firm Governmental Consultant Services.

During his time in the House, Profit chaired the Tax Policy and Higher Education Committees. He is also a former legal adviser and undersheriff in the Washtenaw County Sheriff's Department. Profit was an adjunct professor at Eastern Michigan University.

References

 MIRS News/Truscott Rossman Online Lobbyist Directory: Kirk Profit

1952 births
Living people
People from Mount Pleasant, Michigan
Members of the Michigan House of Representatives
University of Detroit Mercy alumni
Eastern Michigan University alumni
Eastern Michigan University faculty
20th-century American politicians